Onbadhule Guru is a 2013 Indian Tamil adult comedy film written and directed by P. T. Selvakumar. The film stars Vinay, Aravind Aakash, Sathya Sivakaumar. The film is about the adventurous trip that five guys take together, and what happens to them during their expedition. The film released on 8 March 2013 to negative reviews but declared as a decent hit. The title of the film refers to a prediction used in astrology.

Plot
The story begins with a wedding having the bride, but the groom Guru (Chaams) is missing. The bride then decides to call Guru's friend Billa (Vinay), who does not know where Guru is. A flashback then begins.

Running away from their lives due to various problems involving them, Billa, Ranga (Sathyan Sivakumar), and Kochadaiyaan (Aravind Akash), who are good friends, decide to live a bachelor life. However, before they head off, they decide to invite their good friend Guru. Despite the fact that Guru's wedding is in a few days time, he decides to join in the gang. The four friends then take an oath to live a bachelor's life and not reveal the truth that they are married. When they reach the city of Bangalore, they approach Charles (Premji), a college mate of theirs who is now a multimillionaire. Charles, at first, was scared of them as they teased him in college. After a change of mind, he decides to help them live their bachelor's life and bring them to a party. At the party, they see a model named Sanjana (Lakshmi Rai), who danced with them. After the party, Charles brings them to a private condominium where they stay. At the condom, they see Sanjana. The four of them try their best ways to get her as their girlfriend.

After all the adventures they had together with Sanjana, Guru decides to have a bachelor party as he is about to get married. However, the next day, Guru is missing, and the four friends end up being drunk while wearing police uniforms. Billa, Ranga, and Kochadaiyaan get caught by DSP Balram Naidu (K. S. Ravikumar) and soon are advised by him to love their wives and not leave them. After their encounter with Balram, they decide to search for Guru but get kidnapped. The trio ends up in a warehouse, and surprisingly, Sanjana appears. To be even more shocking, she appears as a gangster. It is then revealed that she is the mastermind who kidnapped Guru, as the four of them kept following her to win her heart, which was caught on videotape. She then asks them to give her Rs. 2 crores of money to release Guru such that he can make it for his wedding, and also such that they can take the videotape with them to avoid it being shared to others. They then get the money, give it to Sanjana, and run out of Bangalore, vowing to never see her ever again and taking good care of their wives.

Back in Chennai, they arrive in the nick of time for Guru's wedding, but just before the wedding commences, Apple (Geetha Singh), Billa's wife, stops the wedding and threatens everyone by using a time bomb attached to her waist. Billa consults her and apologizes. This follows with the four of them and Charles running away from her and reuniting with their wives. Charles's new wife is his college teacher, whom he loved back in college. Yet again, they run away, and thereafter, the story continues.

Cast

 Vinay as Billa
 Aravind Akash as Kochadaiyaan
 Premji as Charles
 Sathyan Sivakumar as Ranga
 Chaams as Guru
 Lakshmi Rai as Sanjana
 Mantra as Neelambari
 Sona Heiden as Kumudhu Teacher
 Geetha Singh as Apple
 Hardika Shetty as Laddu
 Yogi Babu as Anniyan.
 Roopashree as Maya
 K. S. Ravikumar as DSP Balram Naidu
 Shanmugasundaram as Chinna Gounder (Billa's father)
 Anjali Devi as Billa's mother
 Boys Rajan as Sivam (Kochadaiyaan's father)
 Manobala as Bun Rotti Babu
 Badava Gopi as Kamal
 Swaminathan as Velu Nayakkar
 T. P. Gajendran as Durai Singham
 Krishnamoorthy
 Chitra Lakshmanan as Gurukkal
 Yogi Devaraj as Priest
 Chaplin Balu as Kalla Saamiyar
 Powerstar Srinivasan as the narrator at the beginning and end of the film
 Perarasu in a special appearance

Production
The film was first reported in January 2012, when it was announced that P. T. Selvakumar, P. R. O of Vijay and producer of Banda Paramasivam had decided to make his directorial debut in a film which starred four lead actors with Nakul, Shiva, Santhanam and Premji selected. Priyamani was also soon after reported to have joined the cast, but the film was not officially announced.

In October 2012, the film re-emerged with a new cast featuring Vinay, Aravind Akash and Sathyan alongside Premji and it was reported that Shriya Saran had been roped in to play important role in this film. But later Shriya Saran denied it as a rumour. Lakshmi Rai was also doing another lead female role in this flick and will be seen donning 2 different getups. Mantra will be making her comeback through the film playing a negative role. Roopashree will be making a debut in Tamil.

Onbadhula Guru shooting started from 11 October 2012. In January, shooting was going in Bangalore. A song sequence featuring Premji and Rai was shot in a club set with Vinay and Aravind Akash also in the scene. Srinivasan shot for an opening song in the film. The shoot for this song was taken at Pushpa Gardens in Chennai. Srinivasan and the rest of the cast are appearing in this number, including Vinay, Premgi and Lakshmi Rai.

Critical reception
The film fetched extremely poor reviews upon release. Behindwoods gave the 0.5 out of 5, stating "The problem with OG is its indecisiveness in deciding whether it has to be a total spoof or if it has to follow something else. There is a continuous lambasting of every other film and every other artist in the film industry, that after a point, watching it becomes tedium.". Rediff gave 2 out of 5 stating "The entire film is like a collection of comic scenes put together to make the audience laugh without much thought to the storyline.".

Box office
The film opened at 200+ screens worldwide. Despite poor reviews by critics, the film grossed  75 lakhs in just 5 days.  Even though receiving negative reviews and disastrous word-of-mouth, nevertheless the film grossed  3 crore worldwide.

Soundtrack

Music of the film is composed by K. The album will have five songs and the audio launch was held on 12 February . Actor Vijay and Jiva attended the occasion to release the album. The lyrics were penned by Na. Muthukumar, Madhan Karky and one more.

References

External links
 

Films set in Bangalore
Indian comedy films
2013 comedy films
2013 films
2010s Tamil-language films
Films scored by K (composer)